Bones UK (stylized as BONES UK) is a rock band from Camden Town, London consisting of lead vocalist / rhythm guitarist Rosie Bones, lead guitarist Carmen Vandenberg, and drummer Heavy.

Rosie Bones and Carmen Vandenberg met each other at the Blues Kitchen in Camden Town and were in the all-girl band Fake Club from 2012 to 2014 before forming Bones UK later that year. They caught the attention of musician Jeff Beck early on in their career, who asked the band to cowrite his 2016 album, Loud Hailer, and to perform with him on tour. Since then, Bones UK relocated to Los Angeles, California.

The band has put out multiple singles independently before releasing their debut, self-titled album on July 12, 2019 via Sumerian Records. On it, produced by Filippo Cimatti, Bones UK confront everything from the "beauty industrial complex" to toxic masculinity, to sexism within the music scene, and also includes a cover of David Bowie's "I'm Afraid of Americans" after being asked by Howard Stern to record the song for a Bowie tribute album. Loudwire named the album one of the 50 best rock efforts of 2019.

Following the success of "Pretty Waste", the single became nominated for a Grammy Award for Best Rock Performance in November 2019. In January 2020, Bones UK released an EP titled "Unplugged" and a short film of their performance online. In 2021, a single was released for the animated TV series Arcane, titled "Dirty Little Animals".

Discography 

Studio albums
 Bones UK (2019)

Singles
 "Fat" (2016)
 "Beautiful is Boring" (2017)
 "Pretty Waste" (2019) – No. 27 Mainstream Rock Songs
 "Filthy Freak" (2019)
 "Choke" (2019)
"Dirty Little Animals" (from the TV series Arcane) (2021)
"Boys Will Be Girls" (2021)

Music videos
 "Beautiful Is Boring" – dir. Alex Warren
 "Creature" – dir. Rosie Bones and Gille Klabin
 "Filthy Freaks" – dir. Ryan Valdez
 "Choke" – dir. Gille Klabin
 "I'm Afraid of Americans" – dir. Eric Thirteen

References

External links 
 
 I'm Afraid of Americans music video

English rock music groups
2014 establishments in England
Musical groups established in 2014